Valson is both a given name and a surname. Notable people with the name include:

 Sunil Valson (born 1958), Indian cricketer
 Valson Thampu, Indian academic and theologian

See also
 Valon